is a passenger railway station located in the city of  Yokosuka, Kanagawa Prefecture, Japan, operated by the private railway company Keikyū.

Lines
Yokosuka-chūō Station is served by the Keikyū Main Line and is located 49.9 kilometers from the northern terminus of the line at Shinagawa  Station in Tokyo.

Station layout
The station consists of two elevated opposed side platforms with the station building underneath.

Platforms

History
The station opened on 1 April 1930.

Keikyū introduced station numbering to its stations on 21 October 2010; Yokosuka-chūō Station was assigned station number KK59.

Passenger statistics
In fiscal 2019, the station was used by an average of 68,092 passengers daily. 

The passenger figures for previous years are as shown below.

Surrounding area
 Port of Yokosuka
 Kanagawa Dental University
Mikasa Park

See also
 List of railway stations in Japan

References

External links

 Keikyu station information 

Railway stations in Kanagawa Prefecture
Keikyū Main Line
Railway stations in Yokosuka, Kanagawa
Railway stations in Japan opened in 1930